Ghayasuddin Siddiqui is an academic and political activist. He was born in Delhi, India, migrated to Pakistan in late 1947 and moved to the UK in 1964.

He has been leader of the Muslim Parliament of Great Britain,  which he co-founded in 1992, and director of one of the oldest Muslim think-tanks in Britain, The Muslim Institute,  which he co-founded in 1973.

Siddiqui claims to have met Sayyid Abul Ala Maududi (whom he considered "charismatic") and much of the early Jamaat-e-Islami and Muslim Brotherhood leadership. Rejecting their methodologies, he forged a close relationship with Iran and met the more radical Ayatullah Khomeini and other members in the revolutionary Iranian leadership. This explains some reports that the Institute was  funded by the Iranian government.

Support for fatwa against Salman Rushdie
Siddiqui supported the death sentence placed on Salman Rushdie. In 1998, despite an apparent relaxation of the fatwa against the author, Siddiqui remained a supporter of the decision, criticising the Iranian leadership by saying to the BBC News that it had no authority to revoke the fatwa, and "the position of the Muslim Parliament is independent of what may or may not happen in Tehran".

His support for the fatwa issued by Khomeini continued as late as the year 2000, as The Independent and the Press Association reported. He said "We support the fatwa but at the same time we have always said that Muslims in this country should abide by the law and not carry out the killing." And added: "It has always been the situation that the fatwa remains in operation and valid."

Post-9/11 views
Today, Siddiqui pursues Muslim social issues such as an end to forced marriages. He was the first Muslim leader to join the Stop the War Coalition, joining its inaugural Central Committee. Siddiqui is patron of the Guantanamo Human Rights Commission, and a commissioner on the Commission on British Muslims and Islamophobia. He is a founding trustee of British Muslims for Secular Democracy. Siddiqui criticises Saudi Arabia and Saudi-sponsored institutions, accusing them of having destabilised the world by working with the CIA against the Soviet Union during the Soviet occupation of Afghanistan.

His son  is Asim Siddiqui, Chairman of The City Circle.

References

External links
 The Muslim Parliament of Great Britain
 The Muslim Institute

Living people
Muhajir people
British Muslims
English people of Pakistani descent
Pakistani emigrants to the United Kingdom
Naturalised citizens of the United Kingdom
1939 births
British academics of Pakistani descent